Sarah Slightly Classical is a 1963 studio album by Sarah Vaughan, arranged by Marty Manning.

Reception

The AllMusic review by Scott Yanow says that "It has often been said that Sarah Vaughan had the voice to be an opera singer. This Roulette LP finds her coming as close as she ever did to performing in a classical vein. Listeners who enjoy hearing her scat and swing are advised to look elsewhere but others who like when Sassy goes a bit over the top and really stretches her voice will find this unusual effort quite enthralling."

Track listing
 "Be My Love" (Nicholas Brodszky, Sammy Cahn) - 3:45
 "Intermezzo" (Robert Henning, Heinz Provost) - 4:25
 "I Give to You" (Mary F. Manning, Johnny Lehmann) - 3:00
 "Because" (Guy D'Hardelot, Edward Teschemacher) - 3:15
 "Full Moon and Empty Arms" (Buddy Kaye, Ted Mossman) - 2:38
 "My Reverie" (Larry Clinton, Claude Debussy) - 3:02
 "Moonlight Love" (Mitchell Parish) - 4:00
 "Ah! Sweet Mystery of Life" (Rida Johnson Young, Victor Herbert)

Personnel
Sarah Vaughan - vocals
Marty Manning - arranger, conductor

References

Roulette Records albums
Sarah Vaughan albums
1963 albums